The Embassy is a Swedish pop duo consisting of guitarist/vocalist Fredrik Lindson and keyboardist/programmer Torbjörn Håkansson. Their music can be described as a blend of disco, twee pop and pub rock. Their music was first released by the independent label Service but is currently released via the bands own imprint, International. The group’s post-modernist attitude, anti-rock aesthetics and disrespectful live performances have made them both loved and loathed.

History

1999: Formation

The Embassy was formed in Gothenburg, Sweden in 1999.

2002: Futile Crimes
The group’s debut album Futile Crimes was released in 2002, preceded by the three singles “Sneaky Feelings EP”, “It Never Entered My Mind” and “The Pointer/Make me sad”. The album consists of 10 songs recorded by Björn Olsson in Sehr Schöön studios. The group sparked controversy during this time for using instruments made of cardboard while performing live, along with utilizing playback.

2005: Tacking
The second full-length album, Tacking, further exemplified the band's self-described style of "Underclass Disco" and won them critical acclaim both locally and internationally. By the end of the 2000s, echoes of the Embassy's aesthetic could be found in critically acclaimed albums by Jens Lekman, The Tough Alliance (who named their imprint, Sincerely Yours, after an Embassy song), Studio (with their Information imprint, also named after an Embassy song), Air France, and jj, among others. After the release of Tacking, the group went silent for several years. They have later stated that this was because they lost faith in the traditional album format.

2011: Life In The Trenches

In 2011, the group released the compilation album Life In The Trenches, consisting of rarities and b-sides.

"Life in the Trenches also embodies most of the contradictions that make the Embassy so beguiling. The impression of earnest sensitivity that makes you want to pat the guys on the head often gives way to a mischievousness that leaves a not-unpleasant sensation that you're being had. […] If these guys were handing out Halloween candy, you'd check it for syringes."
- Marc Hogan, Pitchfork

2013: Sweet Sensation

The group’s third album, Sweet Sensation, was released in 2013 on the group’s own label International. The album clearly showcases the group’s influences of club music while still keeping their distinct sound. During their following tour, the band collaborated with the lighting artist Thomas Hämén. They had previously experimented with light by turning on the light over the audience and keeping the stage in the dark.

2018: White Lake

In 2018, the group released the album White Lake, preceded by the EP "Background Music For Action People". The release consists of 8 tracks, all of which are recorded remotely using Skype. The album is inspired by ”post-punk, acid and eco-terrorism” according to the band. Following the release of White Lake, the band went on tour in Japan.

Style and influence

The Embassy’s blend of various underdog sub culture genres with Lindsons yearning singing and lyrics has sparked both confusion and praise. The interplay of earnestness and mischief puts the listener in a paradoxical situation of two opposing states - being thankful for a beautiful gift and getting the feeling that you are absolutely being fooled. This in turn leads to further confusion — if the listener is in fact being fooled, what are we being fooled of? In an interview, Lindson claims that frustration and euphoria are very closely related.

”Our email address has since the beginning of Gmail been ”embarrassing”, that address says a lot about us as a band. We connect in humiliation and turn it into a strength”
- Håkansson on the process behind White Lake

Discography

Studio albums
2002 Futile Crimes (CD/LP - Reissue)
2005 Tacking (CD/LP)
2013 Sweet Sensation (CD/LP)
2018 White Lake (CD/LP)

Compilation albums
 2011 Life in the Trenches (Album, CD/LP)

EPs
 2004 Wearing Our Pop Art Hearts On Our Sleeves (EP, CD)
 2006 A Compact Disc Including The Embassy (EP, CD)
 2017 Background Music For Action People (EP, Cassette)

Singles
 2001 Sneaky Feelings (Single, 7"-Vinyl)
 2002 It Never Entered My Mind (Single, 7"-Vinyl)
 2002 The Pointer (Single, CD)
 2004 Flipside of a Memory (Single, 7"-Vinyl)
 2005 Some Indulgence (Single, CD)
 2006 It Pays to Belong (Single, Download)
 2007 Some Indulgence Rewind (Single, CD)
 2008 State'08 (Single, 12" vinyl)
 2009 You Tend To Forget (Single, 12" vinyl)
 2010 C’est La Vie (Single, Download)
 2012 Roundkick (Single, Download)
 2013 International (Global mix) (Single, Download)
 2013 I-D (Single, Download)
 2018 Wasted (Single, Download)
 2018 Sorry (Single, Download)

References

External links
 Official homepage
 Service Records

Swedish electronic music groups
Musical groups established in 2001